Chalcidoptera contraria is a moth in the family Crambidae. It was described by Max Gaede in 1917. It is found in Cameroon, the Democratic Republic of the Congo (Equateur, East Kasai) and Togo.

References

Moths described in 1917
Spilomelinae